Pinhook, Indiana may refer to:

Pinhook, Decatur County, Indiana
Pinhook, Franklin County, Indiana
Pinhook, LaPorte County, Indiana
Pinhook, Lawrence County, Indiana
Pinhook, Wayne County, Indiana